Pielgrzymka  is a village in Złotoryja County, Lower Silesian Voivodeship, in south-western Poland. It is the seat of the administrative district (gmina) called Gmina Pielgrzymka.

The village has a population of 910.

References

Pielgrzymka